Camp Creek is an unincorporated community in central Alberta, Canada within the County of Barrhead No. 11.

Localities in the County of Barrhead No. 11